Psyllic acid (also pysslostearic acid, tritriacontanoic acid or ceromelissic acid) is a saturated fatty acid.  The rare fatty acid occurs in insect waxes, in the wax of wax scale insects, in the propolis of bees and bumblebees and in a few plants.  Its name is derived from the alder leaf flea (Psylla alni).

Alkali salts
The alkali salts of psyllic acid are precipitated when alcoholic solutions of the acid and an alkali hydroxide are mixed. The silver and barium salts can be obtained by adding aqueous alcoholic solutions of silver nitrate and barium chloride to alcoholic solutions of the acid. The following salts have been analyzed: C33H65O2Na, C66H130O4Ba, and C33H65O2Ag. Psylla wax is hydrolyzed by alcoholic potassium hydroxide as well as by hydrobromic acid.

Nutritional sources
Psyllic acid is present in Chinese wolfberries.

See also
List of saturated fatty acids

References

External links
Psyllic acid at the Nature Lipidomics Gateway

Fatty acids
Alkanoic acids